The 1990 Eastbourne by-election was a by-election held on 18 October 1990 for the House of Commons constituency of Eastbourne in East Sussex.

Background

The by-election was caused by the death of the town's Conservative Party Member of Parliament (MP) Ian Gow, who was killed on 30 July 1990 by a bomb placed under his car by the Provisional IRA.

The result was a victory for the Liberal Democrat candidate David Bellotti, who defeated former Conservative MP Richard Hickmet by a majority of 4,550 votes and with more than half the votes cast.  The loss came as a shock to many Conservatives who had expected (not least given the circumstances under which the by-election was held, as well as the fact that it had been retained by a majority of more than 16,000 votes in 1987) that they would retain the seat. Conservative MP Ann Widdecombe sent a message to voters saying that the IRA would be "toasting their success".

It was a welcome success for the Liberal Democrats, formed in March 1988, after some disastrous early local and European election showings, as well as dismal showings in opinion polls. It came at a time when Conservative support was slumping and Labour was enjoying a comfortable lead in the opinion polls, largely due to the unpopular introduction of poll tax by the Conservative government.

The Liberal Democrats, whose newly adopted party emblem was a 'bird of liberty', had been compared by Margaret Thatcher in a Conservative party conference speech on 12 October to a "dead parrot".  The shock defeat contributed to the end of Thatcher's premiership in November 1990 as Conservative MPs worried if they could hold their seats at a general election if she remained prime minister.

Result

References

Bibliography
 British Parliamentary by-elections:Campaign literature from the by-election
 UK General Election results June 1987: Eastbourne

See also
 List of United Kingdom by-elections
 Eastbourne constituency
 1925 Eastbourne by-election
 1932 Eastbourne by-election
 1935 Eastbourne by-election

By-elections to the Parliament of the United Kingdom in East Sussex constituencies
Eastbourne by-election
Eastbourne by-election
Eastbourne by-election
1990s in East Sussex
Politics of Eastbourne